WXUR (92.7 FM, "92.7 The Drive") is a radio station broadcasting a classic rock format. Licensed to Herkimer, New York, United States, the station serves Utica, NY.  The station is currently owned by Arjuna Broadcasting Corp. and features programming from Westwood One. The station is an affiliate of the syndicated Pink Floyd show "Floydian Slip."

History
The station signed on as WYUT-FM on March 2, 1986, a simulcast of AM station WALY, which became WYUT in 1987, to match the call letters. On July 20, 1994, WYUT and WYUT-FM returned to the air after a 3-year hiatus and WYUT-FM changed its call sign to the current WXUR, while  the AM became WNRS.
The station broadcast a satellite oldies format with Don Imus in the morning before switching to Active Rock and bringing in Bill Keeler to handle mornings. The station, which then adopted its current branding of The Drive, switched to Classic Hits then Adult Rock after Galaxy Communications, which formerly owned WRCK (Rock 107), took over WOUR, spun off WRCK to the Educational Media Foundation, and began programming WOUR from Syracuse.  WXUR hired former WRCK (Rock 107) morning host Frank McBride to handle afternoons, returned the popular ''Bob & Tom Show  to the market and also added former local radio(WOUR) veterans Tom Starr, Rick Devoe and Alison to the line-up that already included market mainstay Jack Moran.  Jerry Kraus, one of the top area personalities and a market mainstay, for many years at WOUR joined the station for weekends in 2012.  After Frank McBride's sudden death, WXUR completed the migration down the dial of the WOUR airstaff by hiring 'Genesee' Joe Trisolino to take over the afternoon show .

Dare to Be Different era 
 
As of 2018, Genesee Joe was given the Program Directors Position. It was then that WXUR took a turn towards a mix of classic hits and album cuts that relate to the CNY audiences. Trisolino's theory is that "Radio needs to regress in order to progress" in its relationship with the listener. The format tweak also included adding Current artists like Tedeschi Trucks Band, Greta Van Fleet. Joe Bonamassa, Marcus King and Blackberry Smoke to the regular rotation. New songs by classic and 90's artists are played as well.  The station has a loyal and ever growing audience under its new Dare to Be Different format. Trisolino's practices during the pandemic featured heavy entertainment to counter the heavy news of the day. Quarantine Request Hours, in which the listeners got almost any song played for them were a huge hit. The station finally found its true self and has excelled!!  
The DRIVE Airstaff is now made up of The Bob and Tom Show, hosted by Rick Devoe, who also does a weekend shift. Genesee Joe PM Drive M-Sat. . Mid days and nights are handled by Todd . Weekends feature The Doctor Jerry Kraus hosting The Recovery Room Radio Show, Sunday morning 9–12. Lady Di handles Saturday night and Sunday afternoon. Saturday night at midnight Genesee Joe steps in to host One more Saturday Night, a Grateful Dead or Dead related band feature. The Drive has outdone all expectations and has come out of the pandemic leaps and bounds ahead of any earlier era's. The format flip of sister station WNRS to El Zorro Radio Latino has made the cluster a strong point in the market.

GENESEE JOE TRISOLINO DAY proclamations.
On 9/27 2022 Genesee Joe was awarded proclamations from The City of Utica, NY State Senate and Oneida County marking Genesee Joe day and awarding him for 30 years on Local Radio and for his long service to his community. He was also promoted to station Manager.

References

External links

XUR
Classic rock radio stations in the United States